Robert Lewis Glenister (born 11 March 1960 in Watford, Hertfordshire) is an English actor. The son of the television director John Glenister and the older brother of actor Philip Glenister, his roles include con man Ash "Three Socks" Morgan in the BBC television series Hustle (2004–2012) and Nicholas Blake in the spy drama Spooks (2006–2010).

Career
Glenister had a regular role in the BBC sitcom Sink or Swim, which ran from 1980 until 1982. He has also appeared in shows such as Soldier Soldier, Only Fools and Horses (as Myles the millionaire garden centre owner and chairman of the SWANS committee), A Touch of Frost and Inspector George Gently, as well as several films.

He had a starring role in the BBC drama Hustle as Ash Morgan, a high-level con-man who has to convincingly play various roles or characters to pull off a con and lure a 'mark'. He is the only actor who has appeared in every episode of the series. He has also had regular starring roles in the BBC drama Spooks and appeared in Spartacus. He appeared as an Irish-American mob boss in Ben Affleck's crime drama Live by Night, which was released in December 2016. He has been cast twice in Doctor Who, playing Salateen in The Caves of Androzani (1984) (opposite his Sink or Swim co-star Peter Davison) and Thomas Edison in "Nikola Tesla's Night of Terror" (2020).

In June 2022 he appeared as Detective Inspector Salisbury in Sherwood, a BBC serial written by James Graham.

Personal life
Glenister married actor Amanda Redman in 1984; the couple had one child together, daughter Emily, before they divorced in 1992. He later married BBC Radio producer and director Celia de Wolff, with whom he has one child, son Tom.

In April 2019, it was reported that lawyers acting for a company owned by Glenister – Big Bad Wolff – had lost an appeal in a long-running battle with HM Revenue and Customs regarding liability for National Insurance contributions. Glenister subsequently said that he would have to sell or remortgage his house as a result of the ruling, since he now faced a bill of £147,000 plus interest.

Filmography

Crown Court (1979, TV Series episodes Forever) as Kevin Laurence
Birth of the Beatles (1979) as Replacement Drummer
Sink or Swim (1980–1982, TV Series) as Steve Webber
The Campaign (1983, TV Movie) as Jon Lansman
Doctor Who (1984, serial The Caves of Androzani) as Salateen
The Lonelyhearts Kid (1984, TV Series) as Ken
Cover Her Face (1985, TV Mini-Series) as Derek Pullen
Chancer (1990, TV Series) as Colin Morris
Casualty (1990–1994, TV Series) as Chris Wilson / Duncan
Soldier, Soldier (1991, TV Series) as Colour Sergeant/Lieutenant Ian Anderson
Only Fools and Horses (1992, TV Series) as Myles
The Secret Rapture (1993) as Jeremy
Dangaioh (1993, Video) as Gilburgh (voice: English version)
Pie in the Sky (1994, TV Series) as D.C.I. Fields
Persuasion (1995) as Captain Harville 
Prime Suspect: The Lost Child (1995, TV Movie) as Chris Hughes
Dirty Work (2000, TV Series) as Tubes
You Can't Dance (2000, Short)
Just Visiting (2001) as Earl of Warwick
Midsomer Murders (2001, TV Series) as John Field
Lover's Prayer (2001) as Count Malevsky
A Touch of Frost (2001–2003, TV Series) as Det Sgt Terrence Reid 
Safe Conduct (2002) as Capt. Townsend
Hitler: The Rise of Evil (2003, TV Mini-Series) as Anton Drexler
Roger Roger (2003, TV Series) as Dr. Geoff
Eroica (2003, TV Movie) as Gerhardt
Between the Sheets (2003, TV Mini-Series) as Clive Stevenson
Who Killed Thomas Becket? (2004, TV Movie) as Narrator (voice)
Hustle (2004–2012, TV Series) as Ash Morgan
Jane Hall (2006, TV Mini-Series) as Dave Searle
The Ruby in the Smoke (2006, TV Movie) as Samuel Selby
Spooks (2006–2010, TV Series) as Nicholas Blake, Home Secretary
Heroes and Villains: Spartacus (2008, TV Series documentary) as Crassus
George Gently (2008, TV Series) as Empton
Creation (2009) as Dr Holland
Law & Order: UK (2009–2014, TV Series) as Narrator / DS Jimmy Valentine (voice, uncredited)
Honour Bonds (2010)
Coming Home (2012, TV Series) as himself
The Café (2013, TV Series) as Phil Porter
The Great Train Robbery (2013, TV Mini-Series) as DI Frank Williams
Cash Cow (2013) as Nick
Cryptic (2014) as Robert
Code of a Killer (2015, TV Mini-Series) as DCC Chapman
The Musketeers (2016, TV Series) as Lorraine
Paranoid (2016, TV Mini-Series) as Bobby Day
Live by Night (2016) as Albert White
Close to the Enemy (2016, TV Series) as Brigadier Wainwright
Journey's End (2017) as The Colonel
Double Date (2017) as Peter
The Aeronauts (2019) as Ned Chambers
Strike: Lethal White (2020, TV Series) as Jasper Chiswell
Doctor Who (2020, Episode: "Nikola Tesla's Night of Terror") as Thomas Edison
Villain (2020) as Roy Garrett
Sherwood (2022) as DI Kevin Salisbury

Selected theatre
 Edward Voysey in The Voysey Inheritance by Harley Granville Barker. Directed by Greg Hersov at the Royal Exchange, Manchester. (1989)
 Prince Muishkin in The Idiot by Gerard McLarnon. World premiere directed by Greg Hersov at the Royal Exchange, Manchester.  (1991)
 Lord Gorin in An Ideal Husband by Oscar Wilde. Directed by James Maxwell at the Royal Exchange, Manchester. (1992)
 Astrov in Uncle Vanya by Anton Chekhov. Directed by Greg Hersov at the Royal Exchange, Manchester. (2001)
 Wilson Tikkel in Great Britain by Richard Bean at the National Theatre/Theatre Royal Haymarket, 2014–15.
 Dave Moss in Glengarry Glen Ross by David Mamet at The Playhouse Theatre 2017–2018.

Radio
The Party Party 1987
Paradise Lost – Christ (1992, 41 episodes, BBC Radio 4)
Paradise Regained – Christ (1992, 9 episodes, BBC Radio 4)
The Wench is Dead – Sgt. Lewis (1992, BBC Radio 4) opposite John Shrapnel as Inspector Morse
Last Seen Wearing – Sgt. Lewis (1994, BBC Radio 4) opposite John Shrapnel as Inspector Morse
The Sound of Fury (Mike Warner) – Stuart Colman (1994, BBC Radio 4) opposite Anton Lesser as Billy Fury
The Silent World of Nicholas Quinn – Sgt. Lewis (1996, BBC Radio 4) opposite John Shrapnel as Inspector Morse
 Barrymore Plus Four (1995)
Mansfield Park – Edmund Bertram (1997, Classic Serial, BBC Radio 4)
Ghost on the Moor – Graham (2001, Afternoon Play, BBC Radio 4)
 A Game of Marbles – Lord Elgin (2004, Afternoon Play, BBC Radio 4) opposite Paul Scofield
The Woman in Black – Arthur Kipps (2004, 4 episodes, BBC Radio 5)
Henry's Girls – Henry Purcell (2007, Afternoon Play, BBC Radio 4)
The Fiery World – William Blake (2007, Drama on 3, BBC Radio 3)
The Gibson – Saul Judd (2008, 6-part Drama, BBC Radio 4)
The Time Machine – Time traveller (2009, Drama on 3, BBC Radio 3)
The Journey – Stephen (2010, Afternoon Play, BBC Radio 4)
The Exorcist – Father Damien Karras (2014, 2 episodes, BBC Radio 4) opposite Ian McDiarmid as Father Merrin

Audio drama
Doctor Who: Absolution (2007) – Aboresh

Audiobook
The Death of Kings (2008)
The Gates of Rome (2010)
The Cuckoo's Calling (2013)
The Silkworm (2014)
Career of Evil (2015)
Lethal White (2018)
Troubled Blood (2020)
 The Ink Black Heart (2022)

References

External links

1960 births
English male film actors
English male television actors
English male radio actors
English male voice actors
Actors from Watford
Living people
Male actors from Hertfordshire
21st-century English male actors
20th-century English male actors
Glenister acting family